Boehlkea is a genus of small characins found in the Amazon basin in South America.

Species
There are currently 2 recognized species in this genus:
 Boehlkea fredcochui Géry, 1966 (Cochu's blue tetra)
 Boehlkea orcesi (J. E. Böhlke, 1958)

References

Characidae